En Busca de un Ídolo (Spanish for "In search of an idol") is an annual professional wrestling tournament promoted by the Mexican professional wrestling promotion Consejo Mundial de Lucha Libre (CMLL) since 2012 with the purpose of identifying which of the "Rookies" in the tournament would move up the ranks of the promotion. The tournament format contained two rounds, first a round-robin tournament group round, with the top four point earners competing in for a spot in the finals. Wrestlers could earn points in three ways, match results, judges points and points from an online poll available on the 'En Busca de un Ídolo website. Through 2014 no one has participated in more than 1 En Busca de un Ídolo tournament and it has featured 24 wrestlers in total. On May 12, 2015 CMLL announced that the tournament would return for 2015.

En Busca de un Ídolo winners

Tournament point system and format
Wrestlers can earn points in three ways each week during the first and second round of the tournament.
Match results
20 Points for a victory
10 Points for a draw
0 points for a loss

Judging
The tournament also include four judges, referee El Tirantes, ring announcer Miguel Linares and wrestlers Maximo and Negro Casas. The judges could award up to 10 points each based on the way they portray their character, their personality, their charisma, and how much of a fan response they get during their matches.

Fan poll
The third way to earn points for the tournament was through an online poll conducted after each match on the En Busca de un Ídolo website. The online poll could give a wrestler a maximum of 40 additional points in the tournament each week.

The tournament featured eight professional wrestlers or luchadors but was not always split equally between tecnicos (the Lucha Libre term for someone who portrays a "good guy" character) and rudos ("Bad Guys"). Being a professional wrestling tournament, the matches were not won legitimately through athletic competition; it is instead won via predetermined outcomes to the matches that is kept secret from the general public. The teams were not generally divided by their rudo/tecnico status in later years and outside of the first year everyone fought everyone regardless of their rudo or tecnico status. Once the first round was completed the top four point earners would move on to round two. Round two was a round-robin tournament between all four wrestlers. At the end of round two the top two point earners would face off in the finals of the tournament with the winner of the match winning the tournament as well.

En Busca de un Ídolo Participants

References

External links